David Boyd may refer to:

Entertainment
 David Boyd (artist) (1924–2011), Australian artist
 David Boyd (author) (born 1951), Canadian children's author
 David Boyd (cinematographer), American cinematographer
 David Boyd (singer) (born 1988), Danish-American lead singer of the band New Politics
 David James Boyd (born 1975), American composer and actor

Sports
 Dave Boyd (1927–2017), Australian rules footballer
 David Boyd (cricketer) (born 1955), Australian cricketer
 David Boyd (footballer) (1870–1909), Scottish cricketer
 David Boyd (rugby league) (born 1966), Australian rugby league player

Other
 David French Boyd (1834–1899), Confederate army officer
 David R. Boyd, Canadian UN Special Rapporteur on Human Rights and the Environment 
 David Ross Boyd (1853–1936), American academic
 David William Boyd (born 1941), Canadian mathematician
 David Boyd (surgeon) (born 1937), American surgeon

See also
 Boyd (surname)